The First Republic of the Congo Civil War was the first of two ethnopolitical civil conflicts in the Republic of the Congo, beginning in 1993 and continuing until December 1994.

The causes of the civil war laid in the disputed 1993 parliamentary election. the shooting of protesters by Lissouba's troops prompted Kolélas' new militia the Ninjas to move into the areas of his main support base the Pool Department. The capital city Brazzaville was divided. Nguesso's militia the Cobras controlling the north, the Ninjas controlling the south, and Lissouba's militia the Cocoyes controlling the center. Different ethnic groups and tribes supported different sides of the war, with the Kongo and Lari tribes supporting Kolélas, and the Vili and Mbembe tribes supporting Lissouba. Extrajudicial killing were common and after much fighting, 2,000 dead, and tens of thousands displaced, a peace agreement was signed in December of 1994, ending the conflict.

See also
Republic of the Congo Civil War (1997–1999)

References

Conflicts in 1993
Conflicts in 1994
Civil War
Civil War
Ethnicity-based civil wars
Wars involving Gabon
Wars involving the Republic of the Congo
History of the Republic of the Congo
Political history of the Republic of the Congo